The pastoral epistles are a group of three books of the canonical New Testament: the First Epistle to Timothy (1 Timothy) the Second Epistle to Timothy (2 Timothy), and the Epistle to Titus. They are presented as letters from Paul the Apostle to Timothy and to Titus. They are generally discussed as a group and are given the title pastoral because they are addressed to individuals with pastoral oversight of churches and discuss issues of Christian living, doctrine and leadership. The term "pastorals" was popularized in 1703 by D. N. Berdot and in 1726 by Paul Anton. Alternate nomenclature for the cluster of three letters has been proposed: "Corpus Pastorale," meant to highlight the intentional forgery of the letters as a three-part corpus, and "Letters to Timothy and Titus," meant to emphasize the individuality of the letters.

1 Timothy
1 Timothy consists mainly of counsels to Timothy regarding the forms of worship and organization of the church, and the responsibilities resting on its several members, including epískopoi (traditionally translated as bishops) and diákonoi; and secondly of exhortation to faithfulness in maintaining the truth amid surrounding errors (4:1ff), presented as a prophecy of erring teachers to come. The epistle's "irregular character, abrupt connexions and loose transitions" (Moffatt 1911), have led critics to discern later interpolations, such as the epistle-concluding 6:20–21, read as a reference to Marcion of Sinope, and lines that appear to be marginal glosses that have been copied into the body of the text.

2 Timothy
The author (who identifies himself as Paul the Apostle) entreats Timothy to come to him before winter, and to bring Mark with him (cf. Phil. 2:22). He was anticipating that "the time of his departure was at hand" (4:6), and he exhorts his "son Timothy" to all diligence and steadfastness in the face of false teachings, with advice about combating them with reference to the teachings of the past, and to patience under persecution (1:6–15), and to a faithful discharge of all the duties of his office (4:1–5), with all the solemnity of one who was about to appear before the Judge of the living and the dead.

Titus
This short letter is addressed to Titus, a Christian worker in Crete, and is traditionally divided into three chapters. It includes advice on the character and conduct required of Church leaders (chapter 1), a structure and hierarchy for Christian teaching within the church (chapter 2), and the kind of godly conduct and moral action required of Christians in response to God's grace and gift of the Holy Spirit (chapter 3). It includes the line quoted by the author from a Cretan source: "Cretans are always liars, wicked beasts, and lazy gluttons".

Authorship

The letters are written in Paul's name and have traditionally been accepted as authentic. 
Since the 1700s, however, experts have increasingly come to see them as the work of someone writing after Paul's death.

Critical view: rejecting Pauline authorship
On the basis of their language, content, and other factors, the pastoral epistles are considered by many as not having been written by Paul, but after his death. (The Second Epistle to Timothy, however, is sometimes thought to be more likely than the other two to have been written by Paul.) Beginning with Friedrich Schleiermacher in a letter published in 1807, biblical textual critics and scholars examining the texts fail to find their vocabulary and literary style similar to Paul's unquestionably authentic letters, fail to fit the life situation of Paul in the epistles into Paul's reconstructed biography, and identify principles of the emerged Christian church rather than those of the apostolic generation.

As an example of qualitative style arguments, in the First Epistle to Timothy the task of preserving the tradition is entrusted to ordained presbyters; the clear sense of presbýteros as an indication of an office is a sense that to these scholars seems alien to Paul and the apostolic generation. Examples of other offices include the twelve apostles in Acts and the appointment of seven deacons, thus establishing the office of the diaconate. Presbýteros is sometimes translated as elder; via Ecclesiastical Latin  it is also the Greek root for the English word priest. (The office of presbyter is also mentioned in James chapter 5.)

A second example would be gender roles depicted in the letters. The pastoral letters proscribe certain roles for women in a manner that appears to deviate from Paul's more egalitarian teaching that in Christ there is neither male nor female. Separate male and female roles, however, were not foreign to the authentic Pauline epistles; the First Letter to the Corinthians (14:34–35) commands silence from women during church services, stating that "it is a shame for women to speak in the church". Father Jerome Murphy-O'Connor, O.P., in the New Jerome Biblical Commentary, "agrees with many other commentators on this passage over the last hundred years in recognising it to be an interpolation by a later editor of 1 Corinthians of a passage from 1 Timothy 2:11–15 that states a similar 'women should be silent in churches. This made 1 Corinthians more widely acceptable to church leaders in later times. If verses before or after 1 Corinthians 14:34–35 are read, it is fairly clear that verses 34 and 35 seem out of place.

Similarly, biblical scholars since Schleiermacher in 1807 have noted that the pastoral epistles seem to argue against a version of Gnosticism that is more developed than would be compatible with Paul's time.

The pastoral epistles are omitted in some early bible manuscripts, including the fourth century Codex Vaticanus (one of the oldest mostly complete bible manuscripts in existence)  and the second or third century Chester Beatty Papyrus 46 (the oldest mostly complete copy of the Pauline epistles).

Scholars refer to the anonymous author as "the Pastor".

Traditional view: Saint Paul
Among the Apostolic Fathers, "a strong case can be made for Ignatius' use of ... 1 and 2 Timothy". Similarly for Polycarp. The unidentified author of the Muratorian fragment (c. 170) lists the Pastorals as Pauline, while excluding others e.g. to the Laodiceans. Origen refers to the "fourteen epistles of Paul" without specifically naming Titus or Timothy. However it is believed that Origen wrote a commentary on at least the epistle to Titus.

Biblical scholars such as Michael Licona or Ray Van Neste who ascribe the books to Paul find their placement fits within his life and work and see the linguistic differences as complementary to differences in the recipients. While other Pauline epistles have fledgling congregations as the audience, the recipients of record in the Pastoral Epistles are Paul's close companions, evangelists whom he has extensively worked with and trained. In this view, linguistic differences are to be expected, if one is to assert Pauline authorship to them. Luke Timothy Johnson asserts the impossibility of demonstrating the authenticity of the Pastoral Letters.

Date
It is highly probable that 1 and 2 Timothy were known and used by Polycarp in his epistle to the Philippians. Polycarp is known to have died around 155–167, so this would seem to set an upper limit for the dating of the pastoral epistles. Irenaeus explicitly references the epistles to Timothy in his anti-Gnostic treatise Against Heresies, written c. 180. Proposals by scholars for the date of their composition have ranged from the 1st century to well into the second.

The later dates are usually based on the hypothesis that the Pastorals are responding to specific 2nd-century developments, such as Marcionism and Gnosticism. Several scholars have argued that the pastoral epistles attack Marcionism in particular. If Marcion is taken to have started his ministry in earnest only after his excommunication from the Roman church in 144 CE, then this would suggest that the pastoral epistles were written after 144. Furthermore, the fact that Marcion's canon did not include the pastoral epistles is another piece of evidence for which any model must account.

On the other hand, according to Raymond E. Brown (An Introduction to the New Testament, 1997), the majority of scholars who accept a post-Pauline date of composition for the Pastorals favour the period 80–100. Scholars supporting a date in this mid range can draw on the description in 2 Timothy 1:5 of Timothy's Christian mother and grandmother who passed on their faith, as alluding to the original audience being third generation Christians.

See also
 Authorship of the Pauline epistles

Notes

External links

 Calvin, John (1556 [1-2 Tim]; 1549 [Titus]). Commentary on 1-2 Timothy and Titus.
 PastoralEpistles.com, an academic blog devoted to current research in the letters:
 Bumgardner, Charles (2016). "Paul's Letters to Timothy and Titus: A Literature Review (2009-2015)"
 Klinker-De Klerck, Myriam (2008). "The Pastoral Epistles: Authentic Pauline Writings"
 Early Christian Writings:
 1 Timothy
 2 Timothy
 Titus
 Pastoral Epistles:

 
Christian anti-Gnosticism
Pauline epistles
Canonical epistles